Pedro García or Garcia may refer to:

Artist and entertainers
Pedro Flores Garcia (1897–1967), Spanish painter
Pedro García Cabrera (1905–1981), Spanish writer of the Generation of '27

Politicians
Pedro Andrés García (1758–1833), Argentine military man
Pedro Armendáriz García (born 1967), Mexican politician
Pedro García Figueroa, Puerto Rican politician and mayor of Hormigueros

Sportspeople

Association football
Pedro García (footballer, born 1946), Chilean football manager and former midfielder
Pedro García (footballer, born 1974), Peruvian football attacking midfielder
Pedro García (footballer, born 1991), Mexican football midfielder
Pedro García (footballer, born 2000), Peruvian football left-back

Other sports
Pedro García (sport shooter) (1928–1980), Peruvian Olympic shooter
Pedro García (boxer) (born 1932), Peruvian Olympic boxer
Pedro García Toledo (born 1949), Peruvian chess master
Pedro García (baseball) (born 1950), Puerto Rican major league baseball player
Pedro García Jr. (born 1953), Peruvian Olympic shooter
Pedro García (handballer) (born 1963), Spanish handball player
Pedro García Aguado (born 1968), Spanish water-polo player

Other uses
Pedro García, Coamo, Puerto Rico, a barrio in the municipality of Coamo, Puerto Rico

See also
Pete Garcia (born 1961), athletic director

Garcia, Pedro